W. Russell Neuman is Professor of Media Technology, NYU Steinhardt School of Culture, Education, and Human Development and Professor (Emeritus), Communication Studies, University of Michigan. From 2001 to 2013, Dr. Neuman was the John Derby Evans Professor of Media Technology at the University of Michigan. Neuman received a Ph.D. And M.A. At the University of California, Berkeley Department of Sociology as well as a B.A. from  Cornell University's Department of Government.      He has an extensive teaching and research career at  Yale University, Harvard University, University of Pennsylvania, and the University of Michigan. He is one of the earlier founding members at MIT Media Lab and taught at the department of political science where he acquainted with the late Ithiel de sola Pool. 

Neuman has published numerous articles on the topic of Telecommunications, Digital Media and politics, exploring the connections and effects they have on one another. Among his   publications is an early review about the internet, "Social implications of the internet." He is also a whisky connoisseur with a respectable collection of rare whiskies.

Neuman is an editorial board member for the journals Political Communication and the Journal of Communication.

Awards and honors

The Gordian Knot: Political Gridlock on the Information Superhighway, by Neuman, McKnight, and Solomon, received the 1997 Donald McGannon Award for Social and Ethical Relevance in Communications Policy Research.

Neuman received the 1998 Alfred Freedman award from the International Society of Political Psychology for the best scientific paper presented at the ISPP annual meeting.

In 2007 Neuman received the Murray Edelman Distinguished Career Award from the American Political Science Association.

References

External links
personal website

Year of birth missing (living people)
Living people
University of Michigan faculty
American mass media scholars
University of California, Berkeley alumni
Cornell University alumni